Leskovice is a municipality and village in Pelhřimov District in the Vysočina Region of the Czech Republic. It has about 100 inhabitants.

History
The first written mention of Leskovice is from 1379. In 1945, the mass murder of 25 Czech civilians known as the Leskovice massacre took place here.

References

Villages in Pelhřimov District